Mohit Kumar (born 25 September 1996) is an Indian cricketer. He made his Twenty20 debut for Services in the 2018–19 Syed Mushtaq Ali Trophy on 22 February 2019. He made his List A debut on 23 February 2021, for Services in the 2020–21 Vijay Hazare Trophy.

References

External links
 

1996 births
Living people
Indian cricketers
Services cricketers
Place of birth missing (living people)